Yusuf Mukisa (born 19 July 1993) is a Ugandan football defender who currently plays for SC Villa.

References

1993 births
Living people
Ugandan footballers
Ugandan expatriates in Burundi
Proline FC players
Vipers SC players
Bul FC players
SC Villa players
Association football defenders
Uganda international footballers